Gymnopilus purpureonitens is a species of mushroom in the family Hymenogastraceae.

See also

 List of Gymnopilus species

External links
Gymnopilus purpureonitens at Index Fungorum

purpureonitens